Gardena insperata is a thread-legged bug species from the genus Gardena. It is found in Tadjikistan and Afghanistan.

References

Reduviidae
Hemiptera of Asia
Insects described in 1988